The Eaton Building is an historic building in Portland, Oregon, completed in 1905.

External links
 
 Eaton Building at Emporis

1905 establishments in Oregon
Buildings and structures completed in 1905
Buildings and structures in Portland, Oregon
Southwest Portland, Oregon